Kahori, is a small town in Muzaffarabad District in Azad Kashmir, Pakistan. It lies near to the epicentre of the 2005 Kashmir earthquake. Kahori was a defensive and administratively important town during the Dogra period, when it was a major trading center.

References

Populated places in Muzaffarabad District